Luiz Aydos (born 23 November 1954) is a Brazilian sailor. He competed in the 470 event at the 1976 Summer Olympics.

References

External links
 

1954 births
Living people
Brazilian male sailors (sport)
Olympic sailors of Brazil
Sailors at the 1976 Summer Olympics – 470
Sportspeople from Porto Alegre